Myron Pryor (born June 13, 1986) is a former American football nose tackle. He was drafted by the Patriots in the sixth round of the 2009 NFL Draft. He played college football at Kentucky.

Early years
Pryor was born in Louisville, Kentucky.  He attended Eastern High School in Middletown, Kentucky, where he was voted a Second-team All-State player by the Associated Press. He was also a two-year letterman in wrestling and track and field, where he competed in the discus and shot put.

College career
After graduating from high school in 2004, Pryor attended the University of Kentucky. He tore a pectoral muscle in the weight room and was forced to gray shirt his first year of college. He didn't enroll at UK until spring of 2005, where he started the last two games of his freshman season in 2005. In his sophomore season, he started ten games, recording ten forced fumbles, ranking him among the nation's best in that statistic. He recorded 27 tackles in his junior season in 2007, starting 11 of his team's 12 games. In his 2008 senior season, Pryor was named second-team All-Southeastern Conference. He started 10 games on the season, picking up four and a half sacks, and a touchdown on a 72-yard fumble return.

Professional career

New England Patriots
Pryor was drafted by the Patriots in the sixth round (207th overall) of the 2009 NFL Draft. On July 23, 2009, he signed a four-year contract. He was active for 13 games for the Patriots in 2009, recording 20 tackles.

In April 2013, Pryor was released by the Patriots after four seasons, however injuries had kept him out the entire 2012 season and had limited him to two games in the 2011 season.

References

External links
New England Patriots bio
Kentucky Wildcats bio

1986 births
Living people
Players of American football from Louisville, Kentucky
American football defensive tackles
Kentucky Wildcats football players
New England Patriots players
Eastern High School (Louisville, Kentucky) alumni